Dhaka International Trade Fair (DITF) is an international trade fair in Bangladesh. It is organized by the Export Promotion Bureau together with the  Ministry of Commerce of the Government of Bangladesh.

DITF is held from the first week of January to the first week of February every year. The entrance fee is less than $1 USD and it is open from 10 am to 10 pm every day. Ever since the first fair was inaugurated on 1 December 1995, DITF has been held annually at Sher-E-Bangla Nagar in Dhaka on the west side of Bangabandhu International Conference Centre. Starting at the 1st of January 2022 the fair is holding  at Bangabandhu Bangladesh–China Friendship Exhibition Center in the capital's Purbachal area.

In addition to Bangladeshi companies, many others from around the world participate routinely every year. There are country-specific foreign sections at the fair, which has over seven hundred mini-stalls, general stalls, premium stalls, mini-pavilions and mega-pavilions. Many local and foreign products are showcased at the fair. Products displayed and sold include, however not limited to: electronics, cars, porcelain wares, machinery, carpets, toys, ceramics, fabrics, melamine wares, sanitary products, handicrafts, ready-made garments, home appliances, processed foods, furniture, textiles, plastic goods, jute products, winter clothes, leather goods, cosmetics, sports goods and jewelry.

Bangabandhu Bangladesh - China Friendship Exhibition Centre
Permanent infrastructure has been constructed on 20 acres of land in Sector 4, Purbachal for the International Trade Fair. China State Construction Engineering Corporation started construction of the exhibition centre on Oct 17, 2017. Work was completed on November 30, 2020. The cost of the project is Tk 7.73 billion, with the Chinese grant fund Tk 5.2 billion. The government has spent Tk 2.31 billion along with Tk 212.7 million from the EPB's own funds for this project. In future, the name of the exhibition centre will be 'Bangabandhu Bangladesh - China Friendship Exhibition Centre', according to the Ministry of Commerce. Trade Fair (DITF)-2022 begins 1 January 2022 at this Exhibition Centre.

References

Festivals of Bangladeshi culture
Trade fairs
1995 establishments in Bangladesh
 Recurring events established in 1995